The Florida Fourth District Court of Appeal is headquartered in West Palm Beach, Florida. Its twelve judges have jurisdiction over cases arising in Palm Beach County, Broward County, St. Lucie County, Martin County, Indian River County, and Okeechobee County.

History
The Fourth District Court of Appeal was created in 1965, and located in Vero Beach. In 1967, the Legislature relocated the Fourth District to West Palm Beach, and the Court moved to its permanent site on Palm Beach Lakes Boulevard in 1970.

Active Judges

Former Judges

Judicial Nominating Commission
List of members on the Fourth District Court of Appeal Judicial Nominating Commission:
Debra Jenks, Chair (term expiring 2024)
Alexis M. Yarbrough, Vice Chair (term expiring 2024)
Rian Jensine Balfour (term expiring 2022)
David Keller (term expiring 2022)
Mark Miller (term expiring 2022)
Paul Lopez (term expiring 2022)
Susan H. Aprill (term expiring 2023)
Robert Allen (term expiring 2023)
Eric Yesner (term expiring 2024)

See also

 Florida District Courts of Appeal (for history and general overview)
 Florida First District Court of Appeal 
 Florida Second District Court of Appeal
 Florida Third District Court of Appeal 
 Florida Fifth District Court of Appeal

References

External links
Website of the Florida District Courts of Appeal
Florida Fourth District Court of Appeal Website

Florida appellate courts
1965 establishments in Florida
Courts and tribunals established in 1965